The Aymamón Limestone is a geologic formation in Puerto Rico. It preserves fossils dating back to the Middle to Late Miocene period.

Fossil content 
Various fossils have been found in the Aymamón Limestone:

Sharks 
 Megalodon

Bivalves 

 Acar domingensis
 Arca imbricata
 Mimachlamys canalis

Gastropods 

 Bulla umbilicata
 Chicoreus (Triplex) cornurectus
 Hindsiclava consors
 Orthaulax aguadillensis
 Orthaulax portoricoensis
 Vokesimurex messorius

Corals 

 Agaricia sp.
 Favia sp.
 Goniopora sp.
 Meandrina (Placocyathus) sp.
 Montastraea sp.
 Porites sp.
 Siderastrea sp.
 Solenastrea sp. 
 Stephanocoenia sp.
 Stylophora sp.

See also 
 List of fossiliferous stratigraphic units in Puerto Rico

References

Further reading 
 E. N. Edinger and M. J. Risk. 1994. Oligocene-Miocene extinction and geographic restriction od Caribbean corals: Roles of turbidity, temperature, and nutrients. Palaios 9:576-598
 A. M. Nieves Rivera, A. C. Ruiz Yantin, and M. D. Gottfried. 2003. New Record of the Lamnid Shark Carcharodon megalodon from the Middle Miocene of Puerto Rico. Caribbean Journal of Science 39(2):223-227
 H. E. Vokes and E. H. Vokes. 1968. Variation in the genus Orthaulax (Mollusca: Gastropoda). Tulane Studies in Geology and Paleontology 6(2):71-84

Geologic formations of Puerto Rico
Limestone formations of the United States
Limestone formations
Reef deposits
Neogene Puerto Rico
Paleontology in the Caribbean